Inishmore is the tenth studio album by American heavy metal band Riot. It was originally released in Japan on November 11, 1997, two months before it was eventually released in the US on January 27, 1998. The album is based on conceptual sagas of Celtic and Irish myths.

Track listing
All tracks by Mark Reale and Mike DiMeo, except where indicated.

Japanese release 

 The Japanese edition omits track 9 and adds the following bonus track "Danny Boy."

Personnel

Band members
 Mike DiMeo - lead vocals, Hammond organ
 Mark Reale - electric lead and rhythm guitars, acoustic 6 and 12 string guitars, backing vocals, mandolin and Hammond organ, string arrangements, producer
 Mike Flyntz - electric lead and rhythm guitars
 Pete Perez - bass
 Bobby Jarzombek - drums

Additional musicians
 Tony Harnell, Danny Vaughn, Ligaya Perkins - backing vocals
 Kevin Dunne - strings, orchestration, engineer
 Yoko Kayumi - violin

Production
Paul Orofino - producer, engineer, mixing
Jeff Allen, Jack Bart - executive producers
Marius Perron, Bryan Scott - engineers
Jim Littleton - assistant engineer
Joseph M. Palmaccio - mastering

References

1997 albums
Riot V albums
Metal Blade Records albums